This is a list of New Zealand Twenty20 International cricketers. A Twenty20 International is an international cricket match between two representative teams, each having ODI status, as determined by the International Cricket Council (ICC). A Twenty20 International is played under the rules of Twenty20 cricket. The list is arranged in the order in which each player won his first Twenty20 cap. Where more than one player won his first Twenty20 cap in the same match, those players are listed alphabetically by surname.

Key

Players
Statistics are correct as of 1 February 2023.

Notes

See also
New Zealand cricket team
List of New Zealand Test cricketers
List of New Zealand ODI cricketers
List of New Zealand sportspeople

References

Twenty20
New Zealand